Mark Chamberlin (June 2, 1955 – March 22, 2011) was an American film and stage actor. He made his feature film debut in Christmas Evil (1980), and subsequently starred in a leading role in John Irvin's Ghost Story (1981). His final feature film was John Carpenter's The Ward (2011), before his death following a bicycling accident in 2011.

Life and career
Mark Chamberlin was born in Portland, Oregon, and raised in Lake Oswego.  He attended Whitman College in Walla Walla, Washington, from which he graduated in 1977.

Chamberlin began his career in the 1980s, appearing in the horror films Christmas Evil (1980) and Ghost Story (1981). He also appeared in the television film Kent State, and the thriller Edge of Honor (1991). He also appeared in a lead role in the Broadway production of 84 Charing Cross Road alongside Ellen Burstyn in 1982, which ran for 96 performances.

Chamberlin spent the majority of his later career working onstage and teaching acting, and was on the board of the University of Washington's School of Drama. His last feature film credit was in John Carpenter's The Ward (2011).

Death
On March 20, 2011, Chamberlin sustained injuries after falling from his bicycle while cycling. He was hospitalized at Harborview Medical Center, where he died two days later from a pulmonary embolism. At the time of his death, he was scheduled to be released from the hospital.

He was survived by his wife, Elizabeth, and their two children.

Filmography

Select stage credits

References

External links

1955 births
2011 deaths
American male film actors
American male stage actors
Male actors from Portland, Oregon
Cycling road incident deaths
Deaths from pulmonary embolism
Whitman College alumni